Naomi Eleanor Clare Ellington Jacob (1 July 1884 – 27 August 1964), also known by the pen name Ellington Gray, was an English writer, actress, and broadcaster.

Biography

Early life
Naomi Jacob was born in Ripon in the West Riding of Yorkshire, the first daughter of  Selina Sara "Nina" Ellington Collinson and Samuel Jacob. Her father served as headmaster of the Ripon Grammar School, where her mother also worked as teacher. Her maternal grandfather, Robert Ellington Collinson, was a mayor of the town and owner of the Unicorn Hotel of Ripon, where the Prince of Wales once stayed. Her great-grandfather Thomas was the second chief police officer in Ripon. Her father was the son of a Jewish refugee from Prussia, but rejected his Jewish ancestry. Nonetheless, Jacob was much attached to her Yiddish-speaking paternal grandfather, a tailor, who maintained Jewish traditions, and later proudly drew attention to her Jewishness.

Career

After her parents' divorce, Jacob left for Middlesbrough to complete her education and work as a student teacher. She soon left the teaching profession, however, to become an actress in revue. Around the same time, she contracted tuberculosis, a condition that was to affect her for the rest of her life. With physical activity becoming more difficult, Jacob channelled her creative efforts into writing. Jacob wrote non-fiction, biographies, and newspaper articles, as well as a number of novels, such as the Gollantz Saga and Wind on the Heath. Her mother also became a novelist, publishing under the name Nina Abbott.

Jacob had a strong circle of friends, including Marguerite Broadfoote, Radclyffe Hall, "Little Tich", Marie Lloyd, Bransby Williams, and many others. She was also active politically, standing as a Labour parliamentary candidate and becoming involved with the women's suffrage movement.

Her novels often tackle the issue of prejudice against Jews, domestic violence, and the political consequences of pogroms in the 19th century. Many of these books were written before the Second World War and were based on the experiences of her paternal family, who had escaped violence in Western Prussia.

Later life
Jacob moved to Lake Garda in 1930 because the weather was kinder to her lungs. A blue plaque is erected in her honour in Sirmione, where she lived. She was well known in the town and her home was known as Casa Micky. During the Second World War, she returned to the UK to help in the war effort. She worked for Entertainments National Service Association producing morale-boosting broadcasts and live performances for the troops. She never gave up her home in Italy and returned soon afterwards.  She died in Sirmione in 1964.

Personal life
Jacob had a number of female lovers. She did not address lesbianism, though, in her fiction.

Filmography 
 The First Born (1928)
 Glamour (1931)

Bibliography

Standalone novels 

 The Plough (1928)
 The Man Who Found Himself (1929)
 The Beloved Physician (1930)
 Seen Unknown... (1930)
 Roots (1931)
 Props (1932)
 Groping (1933)
 Poor Straws (1933)
 Honour Come Back (1935)
 The Loaded Stick (1935)
 Barren Metal (1936)
 The Lenient God (1936)
 Time Piece (1936)
 Fade Out (1937)
 No Easy Way (1938)
 Straws in Amber (1938)
 Full Meridian (1939)
 The Porcelain Clay (1939)
 Susan Crowther (1940) 
 They Left the Land (1940)
 The Cap of Youth (1941)
 Under New Management (1941)
 Leopards and Spots (1942)
 White Wool (1943)
 Honour's a Mistress (1946)
 A Passage Perilous (1947)
 Mary Of Delight (1949)
 Every Other Gift (1950)
 The Heart of the House (1950)
 A Late Lark Singing (1951)
 Just About Us (1953)
 The Morning Will Come (1953)
 Second Harvest (1953)
 Antonia (1954)
 Irish Boy (1955)
 Prince China (1955)
 Tales Of the Broad Acres (1955)
 Wind on the Heath (1956)
 What's To Come (1958)
 Search for a Background (1960)
 Three Men and Jennie (1960)
 Strange Beginning (1961)
 Great Black Oxen (1962)
 Yolanda (1963)
 Long Shadows (1964)
 Flavia (1965)

The Gollantz Saga 
 The Founder of The House (1935)
 That Wild Lie (1930)
 Young Emmanuel (1932)
 Four Generations (1934)
 Private Gollantz (1942)
 Gollantz: London, Paris, Milan (1948)
 Gollantz and Partners (1958)

References
Paul Bailey, Like a Boiled Monkey : Naomi Jacob (1884-1964). In: Three queer lives: an alternative biography of Naomi Jacob, Fred Barnes and Arthur Marshall (London: Hamish Hamilton, 2001) p. 67-184 
George Malcolm Johnson, Jacob, Naomi Eleanor Clare (1884–1964). In: Oxford Dictionary of National Biography (Oxford; New York: Oxford University Press, 2004)

Citations

External links
Naomi Jacob Papers at the Howard Gotlieb Archival Research Center at Boston University
The Hilda Tablet plays 
The family's love of wildlife.

1884 births
1964 deaths
English stage actresses
People from Ripon
English lesbian writers
English women novelists
20th-century English novelists
20th-century English women writers
Actors from Middlesbrough
Actresses from Yorkshire
Jewish women writers
English Jewish writers
Labour Party (UK) parliamentary candidates